Leptospermum polygalifolium subsp. howense, commonly known as tea tree or tea-tree, is a flowering plant in the myrtle family, Myrtaceae. The subspecific epithet refers to the island to which the subspecies is endemic.

Description
It is a rough-barked shrub or small spreading tree, growing to about 5 m, occasionally to 10 m. The narrowly elliptic to narrowly oblanceolate leaves are 5–8 mm long and 2–2.5 mm wide. The conspicuous white flowers, 15 mm across, appear from November to January. The fruits are woody, 6 mm diameter, domed, 5-valved capsules.

Distribution and habitat
The subspecies is endemic to Australia's subtropical Lord Howe Island in the Tasman Sea. It is a characteristic plant of the island's mountain peaks, sometimes occurring at lower elevations, in evergreen forest and shrubland.

References

polygalifolium subsp. howense
Myrtales of Australia
Endemic flora of Lord Howe Island
Plants described in 1989
Plant subspecies
Taxa named by Joy Thompson